Serena Williams and Max Mirnyi defeated Lisa Raymond and Patrick Galbraith in the final, 6–2, 6–2 to win the mixed doubles tennis title at the 1998 US Open.

Manon Bollegraf and Rick Leach were the defending champions, but lost in the first round to Lindsay Davenport and Jan-Michael Gambill.

Seeds

Draw

Finals

Top half

Bottom half

References
1998 US Open – Doubles draws and results at the International Tennis Federation

Mixed Doubles
US Open (tennis) by year – Mixed doubles